Dantu District is one of three districts of Zhenjiang, Jiangsu province, China. A development called Dantu New City was constructed in the district and was underoccupied since around 2005 and criticized as a ghost city by international media. However, since 2013 the development has been filling up with residents with many operating shops and offices, becoming a functional suburb of urban Zhenjiang.

There are two islands that belong to Dantu, in addition to the Yangtze River at the north it has a town. It is bordered to the east by the Jiajiang neighborhood in Yangzhong. To the south-east lies Danyang and to the west is Jurong.  The Yangtze River borders Dantu to the north.

The district covers an area of 748.8 square kilometers and as of 2003 had a population of 370,000.  The postal code for Dantu is 212100.

Administrative divisions
In the present, Dantu District has 1 subdistrict and 6 towns.
1 subdistrict
 Gaozi

6 towns

Climate

References

External links 

County-level divisions of Jiangsu